"Magnolia" is a song by Australian alternative rock band Gang of Youths, released on 17 April 2015 as the third and final single from their debut studio album The Positions. The song recounts the experience of frontman David Le'aupepe on a "week-long bender that precluded sleep and eating" and his subsequent attempt to commit suicide on 3 June 2014. The date, referenced within the lyrics, has since become known by fans as "Magnolia Day".

In 2018, the song achieved platinum status in Australia. In the Triple J Hottest 100 of the 2010s, the track polled at number six. It has been described as the band's "breakthrough hit", having over 39 million streams on Spotify as of 2022.

Composition and lyricism 
On the song's release day, Le'aupepe wrote a lengthy Facebook post discussing the song's purpose. It begins:June 3rd 2014, Mosely Street, Strathfield. In a state of puerile drunken delirium, reeling from having my heart fucked beyond all recognition and knowing my marriage was about to fall apart, I tried to kill myself.Before the frontman could act, his friends "called the police just in time to intercept" Le'aupepe. He went through rehabilitation and "began a process of healing and self-discovery that is still ongoing in my life today". In an interview with the Guardian, Le'aupepe revealed the song is named after the magnolia tree that the police sat him under after rushing to stop him on the night.

Critical reception 
Jessica Dale of Australian music publication the Music wrote "Magnolia" is "anthemic, catchy and brings hordes of people together in unified song; a stark contrast to the song's birth following Le'aupepe's attempted suicide". She further writes the track "launched Gang Of Youths into the Australian psyche in a big, big way".

Writing for The AU Review, Genevieve Morris called the track a "timeless classic", writing "the passion and liveliness behind the song is addictive and unforgettable".

In 2015, "Magnolia" polled at number 21 on the Triple J Hottest 100 of 2015. In Triple J's Hottest 100 of the Decade countdown in 2020, the track polled at number six.

Music video 
A music video for the song was directed by Le'aupepe and Josh Harris, and was released on 28 January 2016.

Personnel 
Musicians

 David Le'aupepe – writing, vocals, guitar, piano, strings
 Jung Kim – piano
 Max Dunn – bass guitar
 Joji Malani – guitar, keyboard, strings
 Joel van Gastel – drums

Technical

 Greg Calbi – mastering
 Peter Holz – engineering
 Gang of Youths – producing
 Karl Cashwell – engineering, mixing

Promotional

 David Le'aupepe – director
 Josh Harris – director

Certifications

References 

2015 singles
2015 songs
Gang of Youths songs